William Earl Essick  (December 18, 1880–October 12, 1951), nicknamed "Vinegar Bill", was a professional baseball pitcher in the Major Leagues. A native of Illinois, he attended Knox College and Lombard College.

Essick pitched for the Cincinnati Reds during the seasons of 1906 and 1907. He then became a longtime minor-league manager and team executive before joining the New York Yankees in 1935 as a scout.

According to author Jim Sandoval's 2011 book Can He Play? A Look at Baseball's Scouts and Their Profession, Essick was credited with discovering or signing a number of Yankee future stars, including Joe DiMaggio, Lefty Gomez, Joe Gordon and Ralph Houk. He retired in 1950 and succumbed to heart disease a year later.

As a pitcher, Essick had a remarkable 1905 season in the Pacific Coast League for the Portland Beavers, throwing an astronomical 466.1 innings and ending up with a won-lost record of 23–30. He was 19–6 the following season before being called up to the major leagues by Cincinnati and making his Major League Baseball debut on September 12, 1906.

Sandoval wrote that Essick's nickname originated because the German word for vinegar is "Essig."

External links

1880 births
1951 deaths
Major League Baseball pitchers
Baseball players from Illinois
Cincinnati Reds players
Minor league baseball managers
Salt Lake City Elders players
Portland Giants players
Portland Beavers players
St. Paul Saints (AA) players
Knox Prairie Fire baseball players
Kansas City Blues (baseball) players
Toledo Mud Hens players
South Bend Benders players
Grand Rapids Grads players
Grand Rapids Black Sox players
Grand Rapids Bill-eds players
New York Yankees scouts
Major League Baseball scouts